In group theory, an isotypical, primary or factor representation of a group G is a unitary representation  such that any two subrepresentations have equivalent sub-subrepresentations.  This is related to the notion of a primary or factor representation of a C*-algebra, or to the factor for a von Neumann algebra: the representation  of G is isotypical iff  is a factor.

This term more generally used in the context of semisimple modules.

Property 
One of the interesting property of this notion lies in the fact that two isotypical representations are either quasi-equivalent or disjoint (in analogy with the fact that irreducible representations are either unitarily equivalent or disjoint).

This can be understood through the correspondence between factor representations and minimal central projection (in a von Neumann algebra),. Two minimal central projections are then either equal or orthogonal.

Example 
Let G be a compact group. A corollary of the Peter–Weyl theorem has that any unitary representation  on a separable Hilbert space  is a possibly infinite direct sum of finite dimensional irreducible representations.

References

Bibliography

Further reading
Mackey
"Lie Groups", Claudio Procesi, def. p. 156.
 "Group and symmetries", Yvette Kosmann-Schwarzbach

Unitary representation theory
Module theory